Lorna Anne Mainwaring (born 19 October 1974) is a female former gymnast who competed for England.

Gymnastics career
Mainwaring represented England and won a bronze medal in the team event, at the 1990 Commonwealth Games in Auckland, New Zealand.

References

1974 births
British female artistic gymnasts
Commonwealth Games medallists in gymnastics
Commonwealth Games bronze medallists for England
Gymnasts at the 1990 Commonwealth Games
Living people
Medallists at the 1990 Commonwealth Games